Nossa Senhora Aparecida is a municipality located in the Brazilian state of Sergipe. Nossa Senhora Aparecida has a population density of 26 inhabitants per square kilometer.

References

Municipalities in Sergipe
Populated places established in 1963